Spilje Hydro Power Plant is a large power plant in North Macedonia that has three turbines with a nominal capacity of 23 MW each having a total capacity of 69 MW.

References

Hydroelectric power stations in North Macedonia
Dams in North Macedonia